Olaszfalu is a village in Veszprém county, Hungary in Zirc District.

Sights of the village

Church 

It was made in baroque style.

Villax Ferdinand Primary School

External links 
 Street map (Hungarian)
 The official page of the village Olaszfalu (Hungarian)
 The homepage of Villax Ferdinand Primary School (Hungarian/English)

Populated places in Zirc District